Photovoltaic and renewable energy engineering is an area of research, development, and demonstration in Australia.  Two Australian Research Council Centres play a role.

School of Photovoltaic and Renewable Energy Engineering

The School of Photovoltaic and Renewable Energy Engineering at the University of NSW offers undergraduate training and postgraduate and research training opportunities in the area of photovoltaics and solar energy.  It is widely recognised for its research in the area of photovoltaics, most of which is now conducted under the ARC Centre of Excellence for Advanced Silicon Photovoltaics and Photonics.

School of Engineering and Energy

The School of Engineering and Energy at Murdoch University offers a degree programs in physics, nanotechnology, engineering and energy.

ARC Centre of Excellence for Advanced Silicon Photovoltaics and Photonics

The ARC Centre of Excellence for Advanced Silicon Photovoltaics and Photonics opened on 13 June 2003. The Centre is engaged in silicon photovoltaic research and applying these advances to the related field of photonics. The Centre is made up of five research teams seeking ways of improving the efficiency and cost of silicon based photovoltaic and photonic devices.

ARC Centre of Excellence for Solar Energy Systems

The focus for the ARC Centre of Excellence for Solar Energy Systems is the development of improved silicon concentrator solar cells for 10-50 sun linear concentrators. Centre activities are located at the Centre for Sustainable Energy Systems in the Faculty of Engineering and Information Technology at the Australian National University. The Director of the ARC Centre for Solar Energy Systems is Professor Andrew Blakers and the Deputy Director is Dr Vernie Everett.

Innovation 
A sound barrier composed of solar panels helps light a section of the Tullamarine Calder Interchange in northern Melbourne and received an award.

See also

High efficiency solar cells
Martin Green
Renewable energy in Australia
Solar power in Australia
Shi Zhengrong

References

External links
Desert Knowledge Australia Solar Centre
Solar Kogarah - developing and commercialising sustainable energy technology
Slicing the cost of solar power
Solar breakthrough could lead to cheaper power

Renewable energy in Australia
Solar power in Australia
Science and technology in Australia